Pallur  is a village in Thrissur district in the state of Kerala, India.

Demographics
 India census, Pallur had a population of 6305 with 3128 males and 3177 females.

References

Villages in Thrissur district